Paul James Conway (born April 17, 1970) is a retired American soccer player who played as a forward. He spent five seasons in the English lower divisions before returning to the United States. In 2001, he was the United Soccer Leagues leading goal scorer and MVP.  Conway is also the all-time leading scorer for the Charleston Battery with whom he played from 1998 to 2004.

High school and college
Conway, son of former Portland Timbers midfielder Jimmy Conway, grew up in Portland, Oregon, attending Jesuit High School where he played on the school's soccer team. He then attended Hartwick College. He played on the Hartwick men's soccer team from 1988 to 1991. In 1989, he was a third-team All-American. Conway finished his four season at Hartwick with forty-six career goals.

Professional
In 1989, while still in college, Conway spent the summer playing with F.C. Portland in the Western Soccer Alliance. After college, he played for the Brooklyn Italians in the Cosmopolitan Soccer League.  In 1993, Conway signed with Carlisle United of the English Football League. During his four seasons with Carlisle, Conway and his team mates bounced between the second and third divisions. In 1997, Conway moved to Northampton Town on a free transfer. He failed to settle into the first team and was sent on loan to Scarborough. In 1998, Conway returned to the United States and signed with Charleston Battery in the second division USL A-League. He spent seven seasons with the Battery. His best year with the team came in 2001 when he led the league in both goals and points, earning both first-team All-Star and MVP honors. On May 20, 2005, the Portland Timbers signed Conway. He played one season, scoring a single goal in thirteen games, and was released at the end of the season.

Honors
with Carlisle United
Football League Third Division champion: 1994–95
Football League Trophy winner: 1996–1997
Football League Third Division third place promotion winner: 1996–97

References

External links
Charleston Battery profile

1970 births
Living people
American soccer players
American expatriate soccer players
American expatriate sportspeople in England
Brooklyn Italians players
Soccer players from Portland, Oregon
Hartwick Hawks men's soccer players
Western Soccer Alliance players
Portland Timbers (1985–1990) players
Carlisle United F.C. players
Northampton Town F.C. players
Scarborough F.C. players
Charleston Battery players
A-League (1995–2004) players
USL First Division players
English Football League players
Portland Timbers (2001–2010) players
Association football forwards
American people of Irish descent
Expatriate footballers in England